Soe Lin Oo (born December 4, 1991) is a Burmese Lethwei fighter currently competing in the Welterweight division of the World Lethwei Championship. He is the former Lethwei Golden Belt 60 kg Champion.

Early life 
Soe Lin Oo is born in the Inn Shey village of the Thaton District, Mon State and is a member of the Karen ethnic group.

Lethwei career 
Soe Lin Oo has often been called by the nicknames Man of Steel and Ironman due to his incredible pain threshold, which is a crucial aspect among today's Lethwei fighters.

He won the Lethwei Golden Belt 60 kg World Championship in 2010 and 2011.

On June 10, 2017, Soe Lin Oo made his debut on World Lethwei Championship at WLC 2: Ancient Warriors, where he faced Artur Saladiak. He suffered his first career loss via judges decision to Saladiak.

On November 4, 2017, he made his second WLC appearance at WLC 3: Legendary Champions knocking out Ugandan Muay Thai fighter Umar Semata in the second round.

On August 5, 2018, Soe Lin Oo faced Muaythai World Champion Iquezang Kor.Rungthanakeat at Thein Pyu Stadium in Yangon. Soe Lin Oo knocked out Iquezang in the third round.

On September 29, 2018, Soe Lin Oo made his third WLC appearance at WLC 6: Heartless Tigers. He defeated Zhao Wen Wen by knockout in the second round.

On December 29, 2019, in a very anticipated match-up, Soe Lin Oo faced former WMC, YOKKAO, Lumpinee Stadium and Rajadamnern Stadium World Champion, Pakorn P.K. Saenchai Muaythaigym under Lethwei rules in Hpa-an, Karen state, Myanmar. Pakorn was extremely cautious in the clinch to avoid Soe Lin Oo’s headbutts. In Round 4, while in the clinch, Soe Lin Oo floored Pakorn with a headbutt knockout and the Thai was not able to continue.

On August 14, 2022, Soe Lin Oo is set to compete at the Myanmar Lethwei World Championship (MLWC) at Thein Pyu Stadium in Yangon.

Titles and accomplishments
Championships

Lethwei World Champion
 60kg Lethwei Golden Belt (2010)
 Other championships
 2010 Royal Club sponsored challenge fight belt holder
 2010 Dagon Shwe Aung Lan winner (2nd class)
 2011 Dagon Shwe Aung Lan winner (Special)
 2018 Most knockouts Award (Trophy)

Awards, records, and honours

 Lethwei World
 2019 Male fighter of the year

Lethwei record

|- style="background:#fbb;"
| 2022-11-27 || Loss || align="left" | Thway Thit Win Hlaing || The Great Lethwei #1 || Yangon, Myanmar || Decision (Unanimous) || 5 || 3:00
|- style="background:#c5d2ea;" |-
| 2022-08-14 || Draw || align="left" | Payak Samui || 2022 Myanmar Lethwei World Championship || Yangon, Myanmar || Draw || 5 || 3:00
|- style="background:#c5d2ea;"
| 2022-04-09 || Draw || align="left" | Shuklaine Min || Moe Palae Commemoration, Myaing Ka Lay || Hpa-an Township, Myanmar || Draw || 3 || 3:00
|- style="background:#cfc;"
| 2022-02-02 || Win || align="left" | Fahphayap Kwaitonggym || Myanmar vs. Thailand Challenge Fights || Myawaddy, Myanmar || KO || 4 || 1:53
|- style="background:#c5d2ea;"
| 2022-01-02 || Draw || align="left" | Thway Thit Win Hlaing || 27th Myainggyingu Karen New Year Challenge Fights || Myaing Gyi Ngu, Hpa-an District, Myanmar || Draw || 3 || 3:00
|- style="background:#c5d2ea;"
| 2020-02-22 || Draw || align="left" | Yan Naing Tun || Pa Nga Lethwei Challenge Fights || Thanbyuzayat Township, Myanmar || Draw || 5 || 3:00
|- style="background:#cfc;"
| 2020-02-08 || Win || align="left" | Kompetch Fairtex || Myanmar vs. Thailand Challenge Fights || Myanmar || KO (Headbutt)|| 4 || 
|- style="background:#c5d2ea;"
| 2020-01-19 || Draw || align="left" | Pongsiri P.K.Saenchaimuaythaigym || Win Sein Taw Ya 2020 || Mudon Township, Myanmar || Draw || 5 || 3:00
|- style="background:#cfc;"
| 2019-12-29 || Win || align="left" | Pakorn P.K. Saenchai Muaythaigym || Myanmar vs. Thailand Challenge Fights || Hpa-an, Myanmar || KO (Headbutt) || 3 || 
|- style="background:#cfc;"
| 2019-12-21 || Win || align="left" | Pongsaklek BCK Gym || Myanmar vs. Thailand Challenge Fights || Myawaddy, Myanmar || KO || 3 || 
|- style="background:#c5d2ea;"
| 2019-11-27 || Draw || align="left" | Fahphayap Kwaitonggym || Myanmar vs. Thailand Challenge Fights || Myaing Gyi Ngu, Myanmar || Draw || 5 || 3:00
|- style="background:#cfc;"
| 2019-11-03 || Win || align="left" | Shwe Yar Man || Air KBZ Fight 6 || Yangon, Myanmar || KO (Right Knee to the Head) || 5 || 2:59
|- style="background:#c5d2ea;"
| 2019-09-12 || Draw || align="left" | Soe Maung Oo || Lethwei Challenge Fights || Mandalay, Myanmar || Draw || 5 || 3:00
|- style="background:#fbb;"
| 2019-04-19 || Loss || align="left" | Shwe Yar Man || Mon-Myanmar Challenge Fights || Ye Township, Myanmar || TKO (Doctor stoppage) || 5 || 2:07
|- style="background:#c5d2ea;"
| 2019-03-20 || Draw || align="left" | Klasuek Sitjakla || Mon-Myanmar-Thailand Challenge Fights || Lamaing, Ye, Myanmar || Draw || 5 || 3:00
|- style="background:#c5d2ea;"
| 2019-02-20 || Draw || align="left" | Reza Ahmadnezhad || International Challenge Fights || Ye, Mon State, Myanmar || Draw || 5 || 3:00
|- style="background:#c5d2ea;"
| 2019-01-31 || Draw || align="left" | Avatar Tor.Morsri || Win Sein Taw Ya 2019 || Mudon Township, Myanmar || Draw || 5 || 3:00
|- style="background:#cfc;"
| 2018-12-21 || Win || align="left" | Erawan Sor.Chitlada || DKBA 24th Anniversary Event ||Myawaddy Township, Myanmar || KO (Punches) || 4 ||
|- style="background:#c5d2ea;"
| 2018-11-18 || Draw || align="left" | Sankom Sangmanee Gym || Lethwei Nation Fight 9 || Yangon, Myanmar || Draw || 5 || 3:00
|- style="background:#cfc;"
| 2018-10-14 || Win || align="left" | Fahsura Wor.Petchpoon || AH-GA Champions Challenge Fight ||Yangon, Myanmar || KO (Referee Stoppage) || 3 || 
|- style="background:#cfc;"
| 2018-09-29 || Win || align="left" | Zhao Wen Wen || WLC 6: Heartless Tigers ||Yangon, Myanmar || KO (Right Cross) || 2 || 0:40
|- style="background:#cfc;"
| 2018-08-05 || Win || align="left" | Iquezang Kor.Rungthanakeat || Lethwei Nation 50th Media Championship 2018 ||Yangon, Myanmar || KO || 3 || 2:22 
|- style="background:#c5d2ea;"
| 2018-06-23 || Draw || align="left" | Singmanee Kaewsamrit || Myanmar Lethwei Fight || Mandalay, Myanmar || Draw || 5 || 3:00 
|- style="background:#cfc;"
| 2018-05-20 || Win || align="left" | Pravit Sakmuangtalang || Myanmar vs. Thailand Friendship Challenge Fights ||Myawaddy Township, Myanmar || KO || 1 || 
|- style="background:#c5d2ea;"
| 2018-04-08 || Draw || align="left" | Payak Samui || Myanmar vs. Thailand Challenge Fights || Yangon, Myanmar || Draw || 5 || 3:00
|- style="background:#cfc;"
| 2018-02-21 || Win || align="left" | Hareruya || Lethwei in Japan 7: Yuki ||Tokyo, Japan || KO || 2 || 0:32
|- style="background:#cfc;"
| 2018-01-26 || Win || align="left" | Naruto Sathianmuaythai || Giant Fight Myanmar ||Mandalay, Myanmar || KO (Referee Stoppage) || 4 || 
|- style="background:#c5d2ea;"
| 2018-01-12 || Draw || align="left" | Payak Samui || Win Sein Taw Ya 2018 || Mudon Township, Myanmar || Draw || 5 || 3:00
|- style="background:#cfc;"
| 2017-12-19 || Win || align="left" | Newwangjan Phran26 || 80th Kayin New Year Festival || Payathonzu, Myanmar || KO || 2 || 0:47
|- style="background:#cfc;"
| 2017-11-04 || Win || align="left" | Umar Semata || WLC 3: Legendary Champions || Yangon, Myanmar || KO (Right Cross) || 2 || 1:14
|- style="background:#c5d2ea;"
| 2017-08-06 || Draw || align="left" | Artur Saladiak || Mandalay Rumbling Classic Fight || Mandalay, Myanmar || Draw || 5 || 3:00
|- style="background:#fbb;"
| 2017-06-10 || Loss || align="left" | Artur Saladiak || WLC 2: Ancient Warriors || Yangon, Myanmar || Decision (Unanimous) || 5 || 3:00
|- style="background:#cfc;"
| 2017-05-14 || Win || align="left" | Pravit Aor.Piriyapinyo || Myanmar vs. Thailand Challenge Fights || Bilin, Mon State, Myanmar || KO || 2 ||
|- style="background:#cfc;"
| 2017-04-11 || Win || align="left" | Trakoonsing Tor.Jatuten || Myanmar vs. Thailand Challenge Fights || Ye Township, Myanmar || KO || 4 ||
|- style="background:#c5d2ea;"
| 2017-03-26 || Draw || align="left" | Phyan Thway || Clash of Lethwei Tiger 4 (GTG) || Yangon, Myanmar || Draw || 5 || 3:00
|- style="background:#cfc;"
| 2017-02-12 || Win || align="left" | Petrung Sudsakorn || Myanmar vs. Thailand Challenge Fights || Ye Township, Myanmar || KO (Right Uppercut) || 4 || 
|- style="background:#cfc;"
| 2017-01-23 || Win || align="left" | Sanrit Suranaree Gym || Myanmar Traditional Lethwei Fight || Mudon Township, Myanmar || KO (Right Hook) || 3 || 
|- style="background:#cfc;"
| 2016-12-29 || Win || align="left" | Fahsura Sor.Sor.Nawat || (25th) Karen New Year Anniversary || Hpa-an, Myanmar || KO || 3 || 
|- style="background:#cfc;"
| 2016-12-21 || Win || align="left" | Bawsan || 22nd DKBA Anniversary || Myawaddy Township, Myanmar || KO || 1 || 
|- style="background:#cfc;"
| 2016-12-04 || Win || align="left" | Petrung Sudsakorn || Myanmar-Laos-Thailand Challenge Fights || Yangon, Myanmar || KO (Doctor Stoppage) || 2 || 
|- style="background:#c5d2ea;"
| 2016-10-27 || Draw || align="left" | Too Too || Lethwei Grand Prix in Japan 2016 || Tokyo, Japan || Draw || 5 || 3:00  
|- style="background:#c5d2ea;"
| 2016-10-09 || Draw || align="left" | Tha Pyay Nyo || GTG International Challenge Fights 2016 || Yangon, Myanmar || Draw || 5 || 3:00 
|- style="background:#cfc;"
| 2016-06-26 || Win || align="left" | Tawanchai Sor.Pattana || Guest Fight on Golden Belt 2016 || Yangon, Myanmar || KO (Slam) || 2 || 2:46
|- style="background:#c5d2ea;"
| 2016-05-22 || Draw || align="left" | Tha Pyay Nyo || Lethwei Challenge Fights || Bilin, Mon State, Myanmar || Draw || 5 || 3:00 
|- style="background:#c5d2ea;"
| 2016-04-22 || Draw || align="left" | Tha Pyay Nyo || Lethwei Challenge Fights || Ye Township, Myanmar || Draw || 5 || 3:00 
|- style="background:#c5d2ea;"
| 2016-03-23 || Draw || align="left" | Saw Gaw Mu Do || Lethwei Challenge Fights || Ye Township, Myanmar || Draw || 5 || 3:00 
|- style="background:#cfc;"
| 2016-02-23 || Loss || align="left" | Aitor Javier Alonso || Myanmar Lethwei Fight || Ye Township, Myanmar || KO (Right Uppercut) || 3 || 
|- style="background:#c5d2ea;"
| 2016-01-14 || Draw || align="left" | Tha Pyay Nyo || Karen New Year 2755, Taung Ka Lay || Hpa-an Township, Myanmar || Draw || 5 || 3:00 
|- style="background:#cfc;"
| 2015-12-21 || Win || align="left" | Petchchuechip (Tanee Khomgrich) || DKBA 21st Anniversary, Sone See Myaing || Hpa-an, Myanmar || KO (Punches and Headbutt) || 4 || 
|- style="background:#cfc;"
| 2015-12-11 || Win || align="left" | Fachiang Sam || Brave Heart's Fight || Mandalay, Myanmar || KO (Punches and Knees) || 3 || 
|- style="background:#cfc;"
| 2015-11-14 || Win || align="left" | Petchpirun NK Fitnessmuaythai || (60th) Kayin State Day Anniversary || Hpa-an, Myanmar || KO || 3 ||
|- style="background:#c5d2ea;"
| 2015-10-25 || Draw || align="left" | Tha Pyay Nyo || Myanmar Ultimate Fight || Yangon, Myanmar || Draw || 5 || 3:00 
|- style="background:#cfc;"
| 2015-10-11 || Win || align="left" | Orono Muangsima || Myanmar vs. Thailand Challenge Fights || Yangon, Myanmar || KO (Punches) || 1 || 1:26
|- style="background:#c5d2ea;"
| 2015-09-27 || Draw || align="left" | Thway Thit Aung || Mandalay Rumbling Mega Fights || Mandalay, Myanmar || Draw || 5 || 3:00
|- style="background:#c5d2ea;"
| 2015-04-25 || Draw || align="left" | Saw Gaw Mu Do || Lethwei Challenge Fights || Mawlamyine, Myanmar || Draw || 5 || 3:00 
|- style="background:#c5d2ea;"
| 2015-04-13 || Draw || align="left" | Petchtae Tor.Maxmuaythai || Myanmar vs. Thailand Challenge Fights || Hpa-an, Myanmar || Draw || 5 || 3:00 
|- style="background:#c5d2ea;"
| 2015-03-25 || Draw || align="left" | Too Too || Karoppi village Challenge Fights || Ye Township, Myanmar || Draw || 5 || 3:00
|- style="background:#c5d2ea;"
| 2015-02-04 || Draw || align="left" | Jingreedtong Seatranferry || 68th Mon National Day || Ye Township, Myanmar || Draw || 5 || 3:00
|- style="background:#cfc;"
| 2015-01-15 || Win || align="left" | Gligor Stojanov || Win Sein Taw Ya 2015 || Mudon Township, Mon State, Myanmar || KO (Left Cross) || 3 || 0:39
|- style="background:#cfc;"
| 2015-01-06 || Win || align="left" | Petchnikhom (Sankom) || Hnit Kayin Mon Myanmar-Thailand Challenge Fights || Ye Township, Mon State, Myanmar || KO || 4 ||
|- style="background:#cfc;"
| 2014-12-14 || Win || align="left" | Calogero Palmeri || Ultimate Letwhay International Challenge Fight || Woodlands, Singapore || KO (Right Uppercut) || 1 ||
|- style="background:#cfc;"
| 2014-10-12 || Win || align="left" | Petsangnuan Luktupfah || Myanmar vs. Thailand Challenge Fights || Yangon, Myanmar || KO || 1 || 1:30
|- style="background:#c5d2ea;"
| 2014-07-06 || Draw || align="left" | Pravit Aor.Piriyapinyo || Myanmar vs. Thailand Challenge Fights || Yangon, Myanmar || Draw || 5 || 3:00
|- style="background:#c5d2ea;"
| 2014-06-01 || Draw || align="left" | Too Too || Lethwei Challenge Fights || Yangon, Myanmar || Draw || 5 || 3:00 
|- style="background:#c5d2ea;"
| 2014-05-13 || Draw || align="left" | Yan Gyi Aung || Lethwei Challenge Fights || Bilin, Mon State, Myanmar || Draw || 5 || 3:00 
|- style="background:#cfc;"
| 2014-03-31 || Win || align="left" | Yothin || Hangan village Challenge Fights || Ye Township, Myanmar || KO ||  || 
|- style="background:#cfc;"
| 2014-02-15 || Win || align="left" | Yodpetchaek Petchcharoen || (67th) Mon National Day || Thaung Pyin, Mon State, Myanmar || KO || 4 || 2:24
|- style="background:#cfc;"
| 2014-01-25 || Win || align="left" | Yodpetchaek Petchcharoen || Win Sein Taw Ya 2014 || Mudon Township, Mon State, Myanmar || KO (Right Cross) || 3 || 2:00
|- style="background:#cfc;"
| 2014-01-20 || Win || align="left" | Kru Chain || Myanmar vs. Thailand Challenge Fights || Hpa-an Township, Myanmar || KO || 3 || 
|- style="background:#cfc;"
| 2014-01-15 || Win || align="left" | Win Tun || (62nd) Kayah State Day || Loikaw, Myanmar || KO (Headbutt) || 4 ||
|- style="background:#cfc;"
| 2013-12-30 || Win || align="left" | Torkeb Sor.Kamsing || Karen New Year 2753, Challenge Fights || Shwe Kokko, Myawaddy Township, Myanmar || KO || 3 || 
|- style="background:#c5d2ea;" |-
| 2013-05-12 || Draw || align="left" | Tun Tun Min || Lethwei Challenge Fights || Yangon, Myanmar || Draw || 5 || 3:00 
|- style="background:#c5d2ea;" |-
| 2013-04-25 || Draw || align="left" | Tun Tun Min || Lethwei Challenge Fights || Thaung Pyin, Mon State, Myanmar || Draw || 5 ||3:00 
|- style="background:#c5d2ea;" |-
| 2013-03-26 || Draw || align="left" | Tway Ma Shaung || Lethwei Challenge Fights || Lamaing, Ye, Mon State, Myanmar || Draw || 5 ||3:00 
|- style="background:#cfc;"
| 2013-02-25 || Win || align="left" | Win Tun || Lethwei Challenge Fights || Ye Township, Myanmar || KO (Headbutt) || 3 ||
|- style="background:#cfc;"
| 2013-02-03 || Win || align="left" | Saw Yan Paing || Lethwei Challenge Fights || Ye Township, Myanmar || KO || 3 ||
|- style="background:#c5d2ea;" |-
| 2012-11-25 || Draw || align="left" | Phoe K || Lethwei Challenge Fights || Yangon, Myanmar || Draw || 5 || 3:00 
|- style="background:#c5d2ea;" |-
| 2012-09-23 || Draw || align="left" | Phoe K || Lethwei Challenge Fights || Mandalay, Myanmar || Draw || 5 || 3:00 
|- style="background:#c5d2ea;" |-
| 2012-08-12 || Draw || align="left" | Tway Ma Shaung || Lethwei Challenge Fights || Yangon, Myanmar || Draw || 5 || 3:00 
|- style="background:#cfc;" |-
| 2012-06-10 || Win || align="left" | Khamsua || Myanmar vs. Thailand Challenge Fights || Yangon, Myanmar || KO (Referee Stoppage) || 2 ||
|- style="background:#cfc;" |-
| 2012-02 || Win || align="left" | Shwe Min Yarzar || Thaung Pyin Challenge Fights || Ye Township, Myanmar || KO || 4 ||
|- style="background:#c5d2ea;" |-
| 2012-01 || Draw || align="left" | Tway Ma Shaung || Hnit Kayin Lethwei Challenge Fights || Ye Township, Myanmar || Draw || 5 || 3:00 
|- style="background:#c5d2ea;" |-
| 2011-12-18 || Draw || align="left" | Mangkonthong || 4th Dagon Shwe Aung Lan Championship Semi-Final || Mandalay, Myanmar || Draw || 5 || 3:00 
|- style="background:#c5d2ea;" |-
| 2011-11-09 || Draw ||align=left| Win Tin || (56th) Kayin State Day || Myanmar || Draw || 5 || 3:00 
|- style="background:#c5d2ea;" |-
| 2011-11-03 || Draw || align="left" | Masood Izadi || International Challenge Fights || Mandalay, Myanmar || Draw || 5 || 3:00 
|- style="background:#cfc;" |-
| 2011-08-13 || Win || align="left" | Motohiro Shinohara || Myanmar vs. Japan Goodwill Letwhay Competition || Yangon, Myanmar || KO (Right Elbow) || 5 || 1:44
|- style="background:#cfc;" |-
| 2011-07-02 || Win || align="left" | Arkhon || Myanmar vs. Thailand Challenge Fights || Yangon, Myanmar || KO (Right Cross) || 4 || 2:14 
|- style="background:#c5d2ea;" |-
| 2011 || Draw || align="left" | Sit Thway || Lethwei Challenge Fights || Mon State, Myanmar || Draw || 5 || 3:00 
|- style="background:#c5d2ea;" |-
| 2011-03-16 || Draw || align="left" | Torkeb Sor.Khamsing || Mon-Myanmar-Kayin-Thai Challenge Fights, Htin Yu village || Thanbyuzayat Township, Mon State, Myanmar || Draw || 3 || 3:00 
|-
! style=background:white colspan=9 |
|- style="background:#cfc;" |-
| 2011 || Win || align="left" | Lone Chaw Lay || Royal Club Challenge Fights || Mawlamyine, Myanmar || KO || 2 || 
|- style="background:#cfc;" |-
| 2011 || Win || align="left" | Torkeb Sor.Khamsing || Myanmar vs. Thailand Challenge Fights || Kayin State, Myanmar || KO || 2 || 
|- style="background:#c5d2ea;" |-
| 2011 || Draw || align="left" | Tun Tun Min || Lethwei Challenge Fights || Myanmar || Draw || 5 || 3:00 
|- style="background:#cfc;" |-
| 2011-01-16 || Win || align="left" | Dawna Aung || 3rd Dagon Shwe Aung Lan Championship Final || Yangon, Myanmar || Decision || 5 || 3:00 
|- style="background:#cfc;"
| 2010-12-19 || Win || align="left" | Aung Zeya || 3rd Dagon Shwe Aung Lan Championship Semi-Final || Yangon, Myanmar || KO || 3 || 
|- style="background:#c5d2ea;" |-
| 2010-11-21 || Draw || align="left" | Mite Tine San || Lethwei Challenge Fights, Kaytumadi Indoor Stadium || Taungoo, Myanmar || Draw || 5 || 3:00 
|- style="background:#c5d2ea;" |-
| 2010-10-27 || Draw || align="left" | Aung Zeya || Kyaikkhami Yele Pagoda Festival || Kyaikkhami, Myanmar || Draw || 5 || 3:00 
|- style="background:#c5d2ea;" |-
| 2010-09-26 || Draw || align="left" | Muengkaew || Myanmar-USA-France-Thai Challenge Fights || Yangon, Myanmar || Draw || 5 || 3:00 
|- style="background:#cfc;"
| 2010-08-29 || Win || align="left" | Ka Nyaw Htoo || Golden Belt Championship 2010 Final || Yangon, Myanmar || KO || 4 || 0:48
|-
! style=background:white colspan=9 |
|- style="background:#cfc;"
| 2010-08-21 || Win || align="left" | Bi Lat Myay Maung Maung || Golden Belt Championship 2010 Semi final || Yangon, Myanmar || KO || 2 || 2:33
|- style="background:#cfc;"
| 2010-08-15 || Win || align="left" | Dawna Aung || Golden Belt Championship 2010 Quarter final || Yangon, Myanmar || Decision || 5 || 3:00
|- style="background:#c5d2ea;" |-
| 2010-07-25 || Draw || align="left" | Mite Tine San || Lethwei Challenge Fights || Yangon, Myanmar || Draw || 5 || 3:00 
|- style="background:#cfc;"
| 2010-03-07 || Win || align="left" | Payaknoon Sithniwat || Myanmar vs. Thailand Goodwill Letwhay Competition || Yangon, Myanmar || KO || 5 || 2:54
|-
! style=background:white colspan=9 |
|- style="background:#cfc;"
| 2010-01-24 || Win || align="left" | Sit Thway || 2nd Dagon Shwe Aung Lan Championship Final || Yangon, Myanmar || KO || 2 || 1:55
|- style="background:#cfc;"
| 2010-01-09 || Win || align="left" | A Mae Thar || Win Sein Taw Ya 2010 || Mudon Township, Myanmar || KO || 2 || 0:29
|- style="background:#cfc;"
| 2009-12-13 || Win || align="left" | Lone Chaw Lay || 2nd Dagon Shwe Aung Lan Championship Quarter final || Yangon, Myanmar || KO || 3 || 2:29
|- style="background:#c5d2ea;"
| 2009-10-24 || Draw || align="left" | Sit Thway || Myanmar vs. Thailand Challenge Fights || Yangon, Myanmar || Draw || 5 || 3:00
|- style="background:#c5d2ea;" |-
| 2009-02-28 || Draw || align="left" | Tha Pyay Nyo || Dagon Shwe Aung Lan Championship || Yangon, Myanmar || Draw || 5 || 3:00 
|- style="background:#cfc;"
| 2009-02-06 || Win || align="left" | Kyaw Khout || Lethwei Challenge Fights, Kandawgyi || Yangon, Myanmar || KO || 2 || 1:23
|- style="background:#cfc;"
| 2008-10-25 || Win || align="left" | Win Thuya || Lethwei Challenge Fights || Monywa, Myanmar || KO || 1 ||
|- style="background:#cfc;"
| 2008-09-14 || Win || align="left" | Zaw Heik || Lethwei Challenge Fights || Yangon, Myanmar || KO || 2 ||
|- style="background:#c5d2ea;" |-
| 2007-12-23 || Draw || align="left" | Thoe Htein || Lethwei Challenge Fights || Yangon, Myanmar || Draw || 4 || 3:00
|-
| colspan=9 | Legend:

References

External links
 Facebook fan page
 Soe Lin Oo at World Lethwei Championship

Living people
Burmese Lethwei practitioners
Burmese people of Karen descent
1991 births
People from Mon State